François Marie Suzanne (1750 – unknown) was a French sculptor. His works included a full-length statuette of Rousseau, a terra cotta Bacchanal (1776) and a terra cotta statuette of Benjamin Franklin (1793). From July to August 1779 he and Jacques-Louis David visited Naples, Herculaneum and Pompeii.

External links
https://web.archive.org/web/20120328101722/http://www.fichterart.de/kunstwerke/skulpturen/suzanne_%7C_rousseau.html
 

18th-century French sculptors
French male sculptors
1750 births
Year of death missing
18th-century French male artists